Paso Bonilla is a village or populated centre in the Tacuarembó Department of northern-central Uruguay.

Geography

Population
In 2011 Paso Bonilla had a population of 510.
 
Source: Instituto Nacional de Estadística de Uruguay

References

External links

INE map of Paso Bonilla

Populated places in the Tacuarembó Department